Attanagalla electoral district was an electoral district of Sri Lanka between August 1947 and February 1989. The district was named after the town of Attanagalla in present-day Gampaha District, Western Province. The 1978 Constitution of Sri Lanka introduced the proportional representation electoral system for electing members of Parliament. The existing 160 mainly single-member electoral districts were replaced with 22 multi-member electoral districts. Attanagalla electoral district was replaced by the Gampaha multi-member electoral district at the 1989 general elections, the first under the PR system, though Attanagalla continues to be a polling division of the multi-member electoral district.

Members of Parliament
Key

Elections

1947 Parliamentary General Election
Results of the 1st parliamentary election held between 23 August 1947 and 20 September 1947 for the district:

1952 Parliamentary General Election
Results of the 2nd parliamentary election held between 24 May 1952 and 30 May 1952 for the district:

1956 Parliamentary General Election
Results of the 3rd parliamentary election held between 5 April 1956 and 10 April 1956 for the district:

1960 (March) Parliamentary General Election
Results of the 4th parliamentary election held on 19 March 1960 for the district:

1960 (July) Parliamentary General Election
Results of the 5th parliamentary election held on 20 July 1960 for the district:

1965 Parliamentary General Election
Results of the 6th parliamentary election held on 22 March 1965 for the district:

1970 Parliamentary General Election
Results of the 7th parliamentary election held on 27 May 1970 for the district:

1977 Parliamentary General Election
Results of the 8th parliamentary election held on 21 July 1977 for the district:

References

Former electoral districts of Sri Lanka
Politics of Gampaha District